Anthony Bryant may refer to:

 Anthony Bryant (American football) (born 1981), NFL defensive tackle
 Anthony J. Bryant (1961–2013), American author
 Tony Bryant (born 1976), American football defensive end